The Silver Scream is the fifth studio album by the American heavy metal band Ice Nine Kills, released on October 5, 2018, by Fearless Records. Much like their previous album where all tracks were inspired by different novels, all the tracks are inspired by horror films. Some examples of the source material are; A Nightmare on Elm Street ("The American Nightmare"), Friday the 13th ("Thank God It's Friday"), and The Texas Chain Saw Massacre ("Savages"). The album features guest appearances by the band's former singer Jeremy Schwartz, Tony Lovato of Mest, actress Chelsea Talmadge, Randy Strohmeyer of Finch, Buddy Schaub and "JR" Wasilewski of Less Than Jake, Will Salazar of Fenix TX, and Stanley Kubrick's grandson Sam Kubrick of the UK band Shields. The album marked their highest chart positions in the US, debuting at number 29 on the Billboard 200 and number two on the Hard Rock Albums chart. "A Grave Mistake" became the band's first top ten hit on the Billboard Mainstream Rock charts. This is the final album to feature guitarist and vocalist Justin DeBlieck, as well as bassist Justin Morrow, who departed from the band in March 2019 to join Motionless in White.

Five music videos have been released in which lead singer Spencer Charnas visits a psychologist after experiencing dreams based on the songs ("The American Nightmare", "Thank God, It's Friday", "A Grave Mistake", "Stabbing in the Dark", "It Is the End"). A sixth video was also released, though this one takes place in Christmas of 1993, when Charnas was a child and celebrating Christmas Day with his parents ("Merry Axe-Mas").

A deluxe reissue edition titled The Silver Scream: Final Cut was released on October 25, 2019. The reissue contains bonus tracks including the band’s cover of Michael Jackson's hit song, "Thriller", a song about the Scream horror film series, one live track, and three acoustic tracks.

Reception

Wall of Sound gave the album a 9.5/10 and said "The Silver Scream is more than just music, it is an event."

Caleb Newton of New Noise Magazine wrote in a positive review that the album "is an exhilarating exploration of just what metal can be... There's room for bombastic and experimental pressing forward, and at that, such is welcome, and perhaps even needed in the modern music community."

Track listing

Personnel
 Spencer Charnas – clean vocals, screamed vocals, voice overs, piano
 Justin DeBlieck – guitars, screamed vocals, orchestration, keyboard, programming, piano, engineering, mixing
 Justin Morrow – bass 
 Patrick Galante – drums (tracks 14–15)
 Joseph Occhiuti – bass (tracks 14–15)
 Dan Sugarman – lead guitar (tracks 14–15)
 Ricky Armellino – rhythm guitar (track 14–15)
 Drew Fulk – production, mixing, mastering
 Jeff Dunne – engineering, mixing, mastering
 Mike Cortada – album artwork

Writing credits
 Spencer Charnas – music and lyrics
 Justin DeBlieck – music
 Steve Sopchak – lyrics
 Drew Fulk – additional music and lyrics ("The American Nightmare", "Stabbing in the Dark", "Savages", "The Jig Is Up")
 Josh Strock – additional music ("The American Nightmare", "Savages")
 Jeremy Schwartz – additional music and lyrics ("Rocking the Boat", "The World in My Hands")
 Will Salazar – additional music and lyrics ("It Is the End")
 Randy Strohmeyer – additional music ("The Jig Is Up")
 Joseph Occhiuti – additional piano arrangements ("Thank God, It's Friday", "Your Number's Up", "Thank God, It's Friday" (Acoustic), "Savages"(Acoustic))
 Ricky Armellino – additional music and lyrics ("The American Nightmare", "Merry Axe-Mas", "Your Number's Up")
 Dan Sugarman – additional music and vocals ("Your Number's Up", "Thriller", "Savages" (Acoustic), "Thank God, It's Friday" (Acoustic), "A Grave Mistake" (Acoustic))

Charts

References

2018 albums
Fearless Records albums
Ice Nine Kills albums